The Fourth Polish Republic ( or IV RP) was a plan for moral revolution and political change put forth in 1997 by the Polish conservative philosopher Rafał Matyja in the magazine "Nowe Państwo" ("New Country"). "Fourth Republic" was a political slogan used by the right-wing populist Law and Justice (PiS) party in the 2005 Polish parliamentary election.

According to PiS, the current Third Polish Republic is a post-communist creation whose very foundations must be changed to create a truly democratic state free of its past.

“IV RP”, along with its derivative, “V RP” (Fifth Polish Republic), has also been used by critics to satirize the concept of unnecessary constitutional changes made for arbitrary reasons.

See also
 2015 Polish presidential election
 2015 Polish parliamentary election

References
 Polish nationalism resurgent from the BBC
 the project of constitution IV RP made by Prawo i Sprawiedliwość (document in polish)

Conservatism in Poland
History of Poland (1989–present)
Political catchphrases
Polish Republic, Fourth